Erna Schürer (born August 18, 1942) is an Italian actress, model and television hostess, sometimes credited as Erna Scheurer or Erna Schuler.

Life and career 
Born in Naples as Emma Costantino, Schürer moved to Milan where began a career as glamour model, posing among others for Vogue and Harper's Bazaar, and debuted on stage in the Giorgio Strehler's Piccolo Teatro.

After some secondary roles, she had her first main role in Alberto Cavallone's Le salamandre, and, thanks to the success of the film, she obtained a contract with Alberto Grimaldi, for whom she starred in numerous genre films between 1969 and 1977. In the same years she was also very active on theatre, working with Ugo Gregoretti, Garinei & Giovannini, Mario Missiroli.

Later she appeared in some TV-series and shows, such as Domenica insieme and Sereno variabile.

Selected filmography 

  Lipstick (1960)
  Lola Colt (1967)
  Le salamandre (1969)
 La bambola di Satana (1969)
  Erotissimo (1969)
  Battle of the Last Panzer (1969)
  Le Mans, Shortcut to Hell (1970)
  Scream of the Demon Lover (1970)
  Your Hands on My Body (1970)
 Un gioco per Eveline (1971)
  Valerie Inside Outside (1972)
My Pleasure Is Your Pleasure  (1973)
  Nude per l'assassino (1975)
  Snapshot of a Crime (1975) 
  Deported Women of the SS Special Section (1976)
  The Virgo, the Taurus and the Capricorn (1977)
  Specters (1987)

References

External links 

 

1942 births
Actresses from Naples
Living people
Italian film actresses
Italian stage actresses
Italian television actresses
Italian television presenters
Italian female models
Italian women television presenters